was a Japanese noble of the late Nara period. He was the grandson of the sangi Fujiwara no Umakai, the founder of the Fujiwara Shikike.

Life 

Two years later, in 768, he was appointed as governor of Mimasaka Province.

Thanks to the Shikike's staunch support of Emperor Kōnin's ascension, the family was successful in his court. Tanetsugu held various positions as a provincial governor, as well as civil and military roles, and was steadily promoted through the ranks, reaching  in 781. After the deaths of his uncles Fujiwara no Yoshitsugu and Fujiwara no Momokawa, Tanetsugu came to represent the Shikike as the oldest grandson of Umakai.

With the Emperor's deep trust, Tanetsugu was promoted quickly, joining the kugyō with a promotion to sangi in 782.

Nagaoka-kyō 

In 784, Kanmu wanted to move the capital away from Heijō-kyō. Tanetsugu recommended the location of Nagaoka-kyō as the spot for the new capital. Later that year, Tanetsugu was put in charge of the construction of the new capital. His appointment may have had the backing of his mother's family, the Hata clan, whose base of operations in Yamashiro Province was near the new capital site. Several members of the Hata clan were later promoted into the aristocracy based on their meritorious service in the construction.

Assassination 

In 785, soon after the move of the capital, Tanetsugu was shot with an arrow while supervising the construction, and died the next day. Several more people were implicated and exiled.

Later, Prince Sawara was disinherited from his position as crown prince and exiled to Awaji Province, but died en route. There may have been discord between Sawara and Tanetsugu, but whether Sawara was actually involved in the assassination is not clear. A number of the officials involved in the assassination, including Takanari, were employed in the Crown Prince's Quarters. This incident, along with the fear of Sawara's vengeful ghost, contributed to the decision to move the capital again to Heian-kyō a short time later.

He was 49 when he died.

Individuals punished in connection with the incident

Genealogy 

Father: Fujiwara no Kiyonari
Mother: daughter of 
Wife: daughter of 
Eldest son: 
Wife: daughter of 
Son: 
Wife: daughter of 
Second son: 
Wife: daughter of 
Son: , possibly instead a son of Kiyonari
Wife: daughter of 
Other children:
Son: 
Fourth son: 
Son: 
Daughter: , court lady of Emperor Heizei
Daughter: , court lady of Emperor Kanmu

Notes

References 

Fujiwara clan
737 births
785 deaths
People of Nara-period Japan